Possum Poke is a historic hunting retreat outside Poulan, Georgia, United States, and for years was the winter home of Chase Osborn, a former governor of Michigan, author and adventurer. It was a hunting camp. The two main buildings are "Big Poke" and "Little Poke". The "Big Poke" home was owned by Osborn, and he died there in 1949. Stone monuments on the grounds commemorate him and his longtime confidante and second wife Stellanova Osborn, who died in 1988. Though these monuments are sometimes mistaken for the couple's gravestones, the Osborns are actually buried in Michigan.

The site is located on Possum Lane off U.S. Route 82. It is managed by the Sylvester-Worth County Chamber of Commerce, is open to the public, and is rentable for special events.

On April 25, 1974, three marker monuments, two boulders from the Hiawatha National Forest on Lake Superior and a flagpole were dedicated at the site. It was added to the National Register of Historic Places on August 26, 1982. The ownership of Possum Poke transferred from Worth County to the Abraham Baldwin Agricultural College in March 1999. At the time of the transfer, the condition of the house was deteriorating.

See also
National Register of Historic Places listings in Worth County, Georgia

References

Further reading
A tale of Possum Poke in Possum Lane by Stellanova Osborn, The Science Press Printing Co. 1946

External links
 

Houses on the National Register of Historic Places in Georgia (U.S. state)
Tourist attractions in Worth County, Georgia
Houses in Worth County, Georgia
National Register of Historic Places in Worth County, Georgia